Gift Box (foaled  March 23rd, 2013) is an American Thoroughbred racehorse and the winner of the 2019 Santa Anita Handicap .

Career

Gift Box's first race was on August 22nd, 2015 at Saratoga, where he came in third. He picked up his next win in his second race at Belmont Park on October 3rd, 2015. 

He came in 3rd place in his first graded race, at the Grade 2 Remsen Stakes on November 28th, 2015. He then picked up another win at  Belmont on May 26th, 2015.

His next win did not come until March 24th, 2018, when he won at the Aqueduct. He turned his career around when he won the Grade-2 San Antonio Handicap on December 26th, 2018. This was his first victory in a graded race.

His next race was on April 6th, 2019. He competed in his second Grade-1 race, this time at the Santa Anita Handicap, where he was victorious.

He came in 2nd at the May 27th, 2019 Gold Cup at Santa Anita Stakes and then came in 4th at the June 15th, 2019 Stephen Foster Handicap. However, he competed in one last race in 2019 - the December 28th, 2019 San Antonio Handicap, where he won the race for the second time.

Pedigree

References

2013 racehorse births